Theodoros "Thodoris" Vlachos (born 9 July 1969, in Volos) is a retired Greek water polo player and the current coach of  the Greece men's national water polo team.

As a player, Vlachos played for Olympiacos from 1989 to 1998, winning numerous titles. He was also a member of the Greece men's national water polo team. After his retirement, he became assistant coach of Olympiacos under coaches Dragan Matutinović, Zoltán Kásás and Veselin Đuho. He became Olympiacos head coach in 2011, following a successful stint as head coach in Palaio Faliro. Under his guidance, Olympiacos won the 2017–18 LEN Champions League in Genoa, after a 9–7 win against home team Pro Recco in the final and completed a Triple Crown, winning the season's all available titles. Besides the LEN Champions League and the Triple Crown, he has also coached Olympiacos to 10 consecutive Greek League titles (2013, 2014, 2015, 2016, 2017, 2018, 2019, 2020, 2021, 2022) 9 Greek Cups (2013, 2014, 2015, 2016, 2018, 2019, 2020, 2021, 2022) and 7 domestic Doubles. 

In 2014, he became head coach of Greece men's national water polo team, whom he led to the bronze medal at the 2015 World Aquatics Championships in Kazan and the bronze medal at the 2016 World League in Huizhou.

Honours

As a head coach

Club
Olympiacos 
LEN Champions League: 2017–18 ;runners-up: 2015–16, 2018–19
Greek Championship: 2012–13, 2013–14, 2014–15, 2015–16, 2016–17, 2017–18, 2018–19, 2019–20, 2020–21, 2021–22 
Greek Cup: 2012–13, 2013–14, 2014–15, 2015–16, 2017–18, 2018–19, 2019–20, 2020–21, 2021–22
Greek Super Cup: 2018, 2019, 2020

National team
  Silver Medal in 2020 Olympic  Games, Tokyo
  Silver Medal in 2018 Mediterranean Games, Tarragona
  Bronze Medal in 2015 World Championship, Kazan
  Bronze Medal in 2016 World League, Huizhou
  Bronze Medal in 2020 World League, Tbilisi
 4th place in 2016 European Championship, Belgrade
 4th place in 2017 World Championship, Budapest
 6th place in 2016 Olympic Games, Rio

Awards
PSAT Awards Coach of the Year: 2021

References

External links
 
  
  

1969 births
Living people
Greek male water polo players
Olympiacos Water Polo Club players
Greek water polo coaches
Greece men's national water polo team coaches
Water polo coaches at the 2016 Summer Olympics
Water polo coaches at the 2020 Summer Olympics
Olympiacos Water Polo Club coaches
Sportspeople from Volos